Akinlolu Akinayi Akingbala (born 25 March 1983) is a Nigerian professional basketball player who last played for Sáenz Horeca Araberri of the LEB Oro. He played college basketball for Clemson University. He is 2.09m (6 ft 10) tall and he can play both power forward and center positions.

College career
After playing high school basketball at Brunswick School in Greenwich, Connecticut, Akingbala played college basketball at Clemson University, with the Clemson Tigers. A highlight of his college career was a 21-point, 16-rebound performance, in an 86–81 win over Virginia Tech, on 1 March 2006.

Professional career
Akingbala went undrafted in the 2006 NBA draft. In July 2006, he joined the Boston Celtics for the 2006 NBA Summer League. He later signed with the Celtics, but they waived him in October 2006. He then joined the Los Angeles D-Fenders of the NBA D-League.

In December 2006, he moved to Spain and signed with Plus Pujol Lleida of the LEB Gold for the rest of the season. In October 2007, he signed a one-year deal with Ventspils of Latvia.

In September 2008, he signed with Universitet Yugra Surgut of Russia. He left them on 10 December 2008. On 15 December 2008, he moved to France and signed with SLUC Nancy Basket for the remainder of the season. In June 2009, he extend his contract with two more years. In July 2011, he extended his contract for one more year.

In August 2012, he signed a one-year deal with BC Azovmash of Ukraine. In July 2013, he signed with Enel Brindisi of Italy. He left them before the start of the season. In December 2013, he signed a one-year deal with VOO Wolves Verviers-Pepinster of Belgium.

In July 2014, he signed a one-year deal with SPO Rouen Basket of the French LNB Pro A. In February 2015, Rouen released him.

On 6 January 2017, Akingbala signed with Spanish club Sáenz Horeca Araberri for the rest of the 2016–17 LEB Oro season. One month later, he parted ways with Araberri.

Nigerian national team
Akingbala has also been a member of the senior men's Nigerian national basketball team. He played at the 2009 FIBA African Championship.

References

External links
Euroleague.net Profile
FIBA.com Profile
Eurobasket.com Profile
French League Profile 
ESPN.com College Stats

1983 births
Living people
Brunswick School alumni
Araberri BC players
BC Azovmash players
BK Ventspils players
Centers (basketball)
Clemson Tigers men's basketball players
Expatriate basketball people in Belgium
Expatriate basketball people in Latvia
Los Angeles D-Fenders players
Nigerian expatriate basketball people in France
Nigerian expatriate basketball people in Russia
Nigerian expatriate basketball people in Spain
Nigerian expatriate basketball people in the United States
Nigerian expatriates in Belgium
Nigerian expatriates in Iran
Nigerian expatriates in Latvia
Nigerian expatriate sportspeople in Ukraine
Nigerian men's basketball players
Rouen Métropole Basket players
Power forwards (basketball)
RBC Pepinster players
SLUC Nancy Basket players
Sportspeople from Lagos
Yoruba sportspeople